Guernica is a Spanish Basque town and historical capital of Biscay.

Guernica may also refer to:

Places
 Guernica, Buenos Aires, district capital of Presidente Perón Partido in Argentina
 Urdaibai, a biosphere reserve also known as Gernika estuary

Events
 Bombing of Guernica, an attack on April 26, 1937, during the Spanish Civil War

Arts, entertainment, and media

Films
 Guernica (1950 film), directed by Alain Resnais
 Guernica (1978), a short film directed by Emir Kusturica
 Guernica (2016 film), directed by Koldo Serra

Fine art
 Guernica (Picasso), by Pablo Picasso
 Guernica (sculpture), by René Iché

Music

 Guernica (Piano Trio), by Octavio Vazquez

Groups and labels
 Guernica (band), a Japanese avant-garde musical trio
 Guernica, a 1990s American post-punk/gothic rock band, predecessors to 2000s-2010s group Doll Factory
 Guernica, a British record label; subsidiary of 4AD

Songs
 "Guernica", a song from the 2000 album Zamiana Pieniędzy na Rebelię by Włochaty
 "Guernica", a song from the 2001 album Dumas by Dumas
 "Guernica", a song from the 2003 album Deja Entendu by Brand New
 "Guernica", a B-side to the single "Made of Stone" by the Stone Roses

Other arts, entertainment, and media
 Guernica (magazine), a magazine of art and politics
 Guernica Editions, a Canadian independent publisher
 Guernica Vandham, a character from Xenoblade Chronicles 3